Liver-expressed antimicrobial peptides are a family of mammalian liver-expressed antimicrobial peptides (LEAP). The exact function of this family is unclear.

LEAP2 is a cysteine-rich, and cationic protein. LEAP2 contains a core structure with two disulphide bonds formed by cysteine residues in relative 1-3 and 2-4 positions. LEAP2 is synthesised as a 77-residue precursor, which is predominantly expressed in the liver and highly conserved among mammals. The largest native LEAP2 form of 40 amino acid residues is generated from the precursor at a putative cleavage site for a furin-like endoprotease. In contrast to smaller LEAP-2 variants, this peptide exhibits dose-dependent antimicrobial activity against selected microbial model organisms.

References

Antimicrobial peptides
Protein families